The 1995 United States Open Cup is often considered the start of the modern era of the Lamar Hunt U.S. Open Cup, although Lamar Hunt's name was not added until the 1999 edition. It was the 82nd edition of the soccer tournament to crown the national champion of the United States.

The Richmond Kickers of the USISL Premier League won the cup in a 4–2 shootout against the El Paso Patriots, following a 1–1 tie after extra time. The match was played at Socorro ISD Stadium, El Paso, Texas.

Bracket

Rounds

First Round 
 AAC Eagles (USASA) 1-2 Chicago Stingers (USISL)
 Connecticut Wolves (USISL) 0-3 New York Centaurs (A-League)
 Tampa Bay Cyclones (USISL) 2-4 Atlanta Ruckus (USISL)
 Richmond Kickers (USISL) 6-1 Maryland Spartans (USASA) 
 Valley Golden Eagles (USISL) 0-2 Chico Rooks (USISL)
 Seattle Sounders (A-League) 9-2 Everett BigFoot (USISL) 
 St. Petersburg Kickers (USASA) 2-5 El Paso Patriots (USISL)
 Flamengo (USASA) 2-6 Colorado Foxes (A-League)

Quarterfinals 
 Chicago Stingers (USISL) 1-0 New York Centaurs (A-League)
 Richmond Kickers (USISL) 2-1 Atlanta Ruckus (USISL) 
 Seattle Sounders (A-League) 5-0 Chico Rooks (USISL) 
 Colorado Foxes (A-League) 0-2 El Paso Patriots (USISL)

Semifinals 
 Richmond Kickers (USISL) 4-3 Chicago Stingers (USISL) 
 El Paso Patriots (USISL) 1-0 Seattle Sounders (A-League)

Championship 

MVP: Rob Ukrop (Richmond)

External links
 1995 U.S. Open Cup results

U.S. Open Cup
Cup